The 1971 Stockholm Open was a tennis tournament played on hard courts and part of the 1971 Pepsi-Cola Grand Prix and took place in Stockholm, Sweden. The tournament was held from November 1 through November 7, 1971. Arthur Ashe defeated Jan Kodeš, 6–1, 3–6, 6–2, 1–6, 6–4, in the final.

Seeds

  Rod Laver (quarterfinals)
  Tom Okker (quarterfinals)

Draw

Finals

Top half

Section 1

Section 2

Bottom half

Section 3

Section 4

References

Stockholm Open
1971 Grand Prix (tennis)